Sophie Katsarava  (Sofio Katsarava, born 8 December 1976), is a Georgian politician, diplomat and philologist. She was appointed Georgian Ambassador to the United Kingdom in 2020. Between 2016 and 2019 she was a Georgian Dream Member of the Parliament of Georgia.

Early life and education 
Born in 1976 in Tbilisi, Georgia, Katsarava studied English Language and Literature at Tbilisi's Ilia Chavchavadze State University of Language and Culture, graduating in 1999.

Career 
Having worked as press and public relations project manager at World Wildlife Fund from 1997 to 2004, Katsarava joined the British Embassy in Tbilisi in 2005, where her roles included Project Manager, Head of Press and Public Relations, and ultimately Political Secretary. She led the embassy's Chevening Scholarship programme.

In 2016, Katsarava joined the Georgian Dream party as an advisor in the Department for International Relations, moving on to become a Member of the Parliament of Georgia on 18 November 2016. During her tenure she was Chairman of the Foreign Affairs Committee, as well as Chairman of the Friendship Group with the United Kingdom, and Chairman of the Parliamentary Dimension of the Wardrop Strategic Dialogue between Georgia and the United Kingdom. In November 2019 she left the Georgian Dream party and her position in parliament.

In April 2020 Katsarava became Georgian Ambassador to the United Kingdom.

Awards 
In 2016, having served 11 years at the British Embassy in Tbilisi, Katsarava was appointed as Honorary Member of the Most Excellent Order of the British Empire (MBE), in recognition of her outstanding contribution to strengthening relations between Georgia and the United Kingdom in the education sector.

References

Living people
Members of the Parliament of Georgia
Georgian Dream politicians
Honorary Members of the Order of the British Empire
21st-century women politicians from Georgia (country)
21st-century politicians from Georgia (country)
1976 births